Anju is a district of Suining, Sichuan province, People's Republic of China. It had a population of  800,000 in 2021. It was established in 2003 when the Shizhong District of Suining was split into Chuanshan District and Anju District. The district government is located 23 km from the urban area of Suining.

Anju is noted for pomelo cultivation, lotus root, red kiwifruit and Green peppercorns.

References

Districts of Sichuan
Suining